Bughda Daghi (also Romanized as Būghdā Dāghī; also known as Boghdeh Dāghī) is a village in Il Teymur Rural District, in the Central District of Bukan County, West Azerbaijan Province, Iran. At the 2006 census, its population was 106, in 20 families.

References 

Populated places in Bukan County